Artavazd Awards (Artavazd mrcanakabashkhutiun) is an annual national Theatrical awards ceremony first held in Yerevan, Armenia, in 2002. The awards are named after an Armenian King Artavasdes and are held on World Theatre Day. The awards are created and sponsored by Union of Theatrical Figures of Armenia to appreciate and spur the activities of individuals and creators of theatrical performances. The awards consist of 13 categories. Each year, the award ceremony airs live on Public Television company of Armenia.

References

Awards established in 2002
Armenian-language television shows
2010s in Armenia
2000s in Armenia
2020s in Armenia
2002 in Armenia